The women's pole vault at the 2022 World Athletics U20 Championships was held at the Estadio Olímpico Pascual Guerrero on 1 and 4 August.

Records
U20 standing records prior to the 2022 World Athletics U20 Championships were as follows:

Results

Qualification
The qualification round took place on 1 August, in two groups, both starting at 15:35. Athletes attaining a mark of at least 4.25 metres ( Q ) or at least the 12 best performers ( q ) qualified for the final.

Final
The final started at 11:01 on 4 August.

References

pole vault
Pole vault at the World Athletics U20 Championships